Qasey Atajuq  (? — 1773) was the Kabardian Grand Prince between 1762 and 1773.

Biography 
He was against the construction of the Mozdok fortress in Circassian lands, and saw it as an invasion of Circassia by Russia.

After 1765, he consistently advocated the destruction of Mozdok.

After the outbreak of the Russo-Turkish war of 1768–1774, Qasey Atajuq searched for ways to strengthen Kabardian sovereignty by diplomatic methods. He remained dissatisfied with the conditions for Russian annexation of Kabarda. In the last years of his life, Atajuq was actively looking for allies to exert diplomatic and military-political pressure on Russia.

In 1773, he died.

References 

1773 deaths
People of the Caucasian War
Circassian military personnel of the Russo-Circassian War